The 1936 Arkansas Razorbacks football team represented the University of Arkansas in the Southwest Conference (SWC) during the 1936 college football season. In their eighth year under head coach Fred Thomsen, the Razorbacks compiled a 7–3 record (5–1 against SWC opponents), finished in first place in the SWC, and outscored their opponents by a combined total of 178 to 87.

The season is notable for being the first season that Arkansas finished ranked in the AP poll.

Schedule

References

Arkansas
Arkansas Razorbacks football seasons
Southwest Conference football champion seasons
Arkansas Razorbacks football